The manga adaptation of Yoshiki Tanaka's The Heroic Legend of Arslan by Hiromu Arakawa was announced in the June issue of Kodansha's Bessatsu Shōnen Magazine, released in May 2013. The series began in the August issue of the magazine, released on July 9, 2013. Kodansha has collected its chapters into individual tankōbon volumes. The first volume was released on April 9, 2014. As of December 9, 2022, eighteen volumes have been released.

In North America, the manga was digitally published in English by Crunchyroll Manga from 2014 until 2018, when the company announced that they would no longer publish manga from Kodansha. Kodansha USA began publishing the manga in print and digital format on August 19, 2014.


Volume list

Chapters not yet in tankōbon format
113. 
114.

References

Heroic Legend of Arslan, The